The Carlisle Arizona Women's Golf Classic is a tournament on the Epson Tour, the LPGA's developmental tour. It was first played in 2013 and has always been held at Longbow Golf Club in Mesa, Arizona.

History
For 2013 and 2014, the title sponsor of the tournament was VisitMesa.com, the official website of the Mesa Convention and Visitors Bureau. Former Arizona State player Jaclyn Sweeney won the inaugural tournament, closing with birdies in three of the last four holes in windy conditions for a two-stroke victory. She also received a spot in the LPGA Founders Cup.

The tournament was a 54-hole event, as were most Epson Tour tournaments, and included pre-tournament pro-am opportunities, in which local amateur golfers can play with the professional golfers from the Tour. 

In 2015, at 16 years, 9 months, 11 days, Hannah O'Sullivan became the youngest player win on the Epson Tour. The age mark was previously held by Cristie Kerr, who won the 1995 Ironwood Futures Classic in Florida at the age of 17. She also become just the third woman to win on the LPGA Tour or the Epson Tour before her 17th birthday, the only other women to win as a 16-year-old are Lydia Ko and Lexi Thompson.

In 2021 Carlisle Companies became title sponsor and play was extended to 72 holes. Ruixin Liu of China and 17-year-old amateur Rose Zhang finished 17-under par after 72-holes. Both made par on the first playoff-hole, but on the next hole Zhang's second shot found the desert left of the fairway and she had to take an unplayable. Liu made a birdie to win her fifth Symetra Tour title.

In 2022 players competed for $250,000, tied with the Epson Tour Championship for the second-highest purse of the season.

Tournament names through the years:
2013: VisitMesa.com Gateway Classic
2014: Visit Mesa Gateway Classic at Longbow Golf Club
2015: Gateway Classic
2017: Gateway Classic at Longbow Golf Club
2020: Founders Tribute at Longbow
2021–2023: Carlisle Arizona Women's Golf Classic

Winners

Tournament records

References

External links

Coverage on Epson Tour website

Symetra Tour events
Golf in Arizona
Sports in Mesa, Arizona
Women's sports in Arizona
Sports competitions in Maricopa County, Arizona